Vladimir Viktorovich Semyonov (born 25 June 1972) is a Russian former football player.

External links
 

1972 births
Sportspeople from Omsk
Living people
Soviet footballers
Russian footballers
Russia under-21 international footballers
PFC CSKA Moscow players
Russian Premier League players
FC Dynamo Moscow players
FC Sokol Saratov players
FC Metallurg Lipetsk players
FC Arsenal Tula players
FC Moscow players
FC Rubin Kazan players
FC Irtysh Omsk players
FC Salyut Belgorod players
Association football midfielders